is an annual professional wrestling round-robin tournament held by Pro Wrestling Zero1 to determine the top wrestler in the promotion, typically contested in late July/early August. Within the English-speaking professional wrestling world, the tournament is commonly referred to by its translated name Fire Festival. In addition to Zero1 members, it has frequently included outside stars, including 2003 winner Satoshi Kojima, Kensuke Sasaki and Taka Michinoku.

Since 2002, it has featured two blocks, each with five participants, with the two block winners facing off in the final to determine the overall champion. The 2001 Fire Festival only featured four in each block, but held the same principle. The winner of the tournament is presented with the "Fire Sword", which they carry for the following year until the next Festival.

Results

List of winners

2001

The 2001 Fire Festival was held from September 1 to September 15, over three weekly events on September 1, 8 and 15; four tournament matches were held at each, including the final on September 15.

2002

The 2002 Fire Festival expanded the tournament to include 10 participants, and was held from July 28 to August 4 over five shows, each featuring four tournament matches.

2003

The 2003 Fire Festival was held from July 25 to August 1, with four matches on July 27 being contested in All Japan Pro Wrestling. The winner, Satoshi Kojima, is to date the only "outsider" to win the Fire Festival, representing AJPW.

2004

The 2004 Fire Festival was held from July 27 to August 1, over five shows.

2005

The 2005 Fire Festival was held from July 29 to August 7, over five shows.

2006

The 2006 Fire Festival was held from July 20 to July 29, over six shows. Due to a tie for first place in Block A, a four-way elimination match was made on the night of the final to determine the winner of the block, with that man facing Block B winner Ryouji Sai later in the night. This would end up being Masato Tanaka, who also went on to defeat Sai and win the tournament. The top 4 in Block A are ranked below by order of elimination, with the first eliminated, Kazunari Murakami, ranked lowest.

2007

The 2007 Fire Festival was held from July 16 to August 2, over nine shows. Four of the ten participants were determined by each winning a qualifying match on May 27. Four more were determined by fan voting, and the final two were outsiders handpicked by ZERO1-MAX. On July 20, it was announced that Ikuto Hidaka would be replacing Kazunari Murakami, who was forced out of action after just one match due to a head injury, due to finishing in fifth place in the fan vote. In a similar situation to the 2006 tournament, Block A ended in a full tie with four points, leading to a five-way match on August 2 to determine the finalist. The participants and schedule are as follows:

1Kazunari Murakami wrestled this match; Hidaka was awarded the point upon replacing Murakami.

2008
The 2008 Fire Festival was held from July 27 to August 3 over six shows. It featured ten participants in two blocks, including outside participation from Big Japan Pro Wrestling's Daisuke Sekimoto, New Japan Pro-Wrestling's Manabu Nakanishi and Togi Makabe and Dragon Gate's Masaaki Mochizuki. As a result of a tie for the lead in Block B, a three-way match between Nakanishi, Takao Omori and Masato Tanaka would be held on the final day to decide the finalist; Tanaka won the match by pinning Omori, and would defeat Makabe in the final.

2009
The 2009 Fire Festival was held from July 25 to August 8 over seven shows. It featured ten participants in two blocks, including outside participation from Big Japan Pro Wrestling's Daisuke Sekimoto and Apache Army's Tetsuhiro Kuroda. Both blocks ended in a tie for first place after the group stage; a four-way tie in Block A between Kohei Sato, Akebono, Ikuto Hidaka and Shinjiro Otani, and a three-way tie in Block B between Ryouji Sai, Masato Tanaka and Daisuke Sekimoto. This marked the fourth year in a row that such a tie has occurred. Both ties would be decided in a three- or four-way match on the night of the tournament. Sato and Sai won their respective matches, and Sai would go on to win the final.

2010
The 2010 Fire Festival was held from July 24 to August 4 over seven shows. It featured ten participants in two blocks.

2011
The 2011 Fire Festival was held from July 24 to August 7 over eight shows. It featured ten participants in two blocks.

2012
The 2012 Fire Festival was held from July 20 to August 5 over eleven shows. It featured ten participants in two blocks.

2013
The 2013 Fire Festival was held from July 17 to August 4 over ten shows. It featured twelve participants in two blocks and was contested for the vacant World Heavyweight Championship. New Zealander James Raideen became the first foreigner to win the tournament. At 22 years old, he also became both the youngest winner of the tournament and the youngest World Heavyweight Champion in history.

2014
The 2014 Fire Festival took place from July 13 to August 3 over nine shows. It featured twelve participants in two blocks, including outside participation from Big Japan Pro Wrestling's Daisuke Sekimoto and Kazuki Hashimoto, freelancer Hideki Suzuki and Wrestle-1's Kai. One of the matches in the tournament took place at an event held by Wrestle-1. 2014 marked the first time the tournament featured semifinal matches.

2015
The 2015 Fire Festival took place from July 16 to August 2 over eleven shows. It featured twelve participants in two blocks. Fujita Hayato was forced to pull out of the tournament with a knee injury following his first match, forfeiting the rest of his matches.

2016
The 2016 Fire Festival took place from July 8 to 31 over eleven shows. In the tournament, a win by a pinfall, submission or knockout was worth five points, a win by countout, disqualification, TKO or referee stoppage was worth four points, a draw was worth three points and a loss none. Buffa missed his first eight matches in the tournament due to an injury.

2017

The 2017 Fire Festival ran from July 9 to 30 over 13 shows.

2018
The 2018 Fire Festival took place from July 8 to July 29 over ten shows. It featured fourteen participants in two blocks. The point system from 2016 and 2017 returned for the third year.

2019
The 2019 Fire Festival took place from June 16 to July 28 over nine shows. It featured fourteen participants in two blocks. The point system from 2016, 2017, and 2018 returned for the fourth year.

2020
The 2020 edition of the Fire Festival extended on nine nights and culminated on October 25, 2020.

2021
The 2021 edition of the event will take place between July 2 and August 1, 2021.

2022
The 2022 edition of the event will take place between July 1 and July 31, 2022.

See also

Champion Carnival
G1 Climax
N-1 Victory
Ikkitousen Strong Climb
D-Oh Grand Prix
King of Gate

References

External links
 ZERO1 USA English language website
 ZERO1 Japanese language website
MAXIMUM Zero
Shining Road
ZEROONEUSA.com

Pro Wrestling Zero1
Professional wrestling tournaments